Ugochukwu John Ogu (born 20 April 1988) is a Nigerian professional footballer who plays as a midfielder for Israeli club Maccabi Jaffa and the Nigeria national team.

Club career

Early career
Ogu began playing football at the youth departments of Akwa Starlets, Akwa United and the Flying Sports Academy. On 23 September 2006, he began his senior career in Slovenia when he signed with Drava Ptuj from the Slovenian PrvaLiga. In his four-year stint, Ogu scored eight goals in 97 appearances.

In Portugal
In the summer of 2010, Ogu moved to Atlético Clube de Portugal, which then played in the Terceira Divisão in Portugal. After six months, he moved to neighboring Spain and signed for Almería, but played only in Almería B of the third division. In November 2011 Ogu returned to Portugal and joined Leiria, but at the end of the season the team dropped to the second division.

In July 2012, Ogu moved to Académica from Primeira Liga. Ogu scored his first goal in the third round of the Portuguese Cup against Ponte da Barca. He scored his first league goal against Vitória de Setúbal in a decisive win that ensured the team remain in the top division. All in all, Ogu played two years at Académica and scored one goal in 27 league appearances.

Hapoel Be'er Sheva
In the 2014–15 season, Ogu arrived in Israel and on 2 September 2014 made his debut in Hapoel Be'er Sheva in a 0–0 draw against Maccabi Petah Tikva in the Toto Cup. On 7 September, he signed a four-year contract with Hapoel Be'er Sheva. Five days later, he made his debut in the Israeli Premier League when he opened the team against Beitar Jerusalem at Vasermil Stadium and on 29 November scored his first goal in Hapoel Be'er Sheva in a 4–0 home win over Maccabi Netanya. In the first season of the team, and at the end of the season reached the finals of the Israel State Cup, losing to Maccabi Tel Aviv.
 
In the 2015–16 season he competed with Hapoel Be'er Sheva in the UEFA Europa League qualifying and even scored a goal against FC Thun from the Swiss Super League, but the team was eliminated in both games. Later in the season he scored four goals and assisted five, was part of the team's winning the State Championship and was among the candidates for the title of footballer of the season.

Entering the 2016–17 season, Ogu was ranked on Walla Sports web site as the number 1 footballer in Israel by 60 sports journalists and professionals. On 11 August 2016, Ogu won the Israel Super Cup with Hapoel Be'er Sheva after winning 4–2 against Maccabi Haifa. Later on, he faced the UEFA Champions League qualifying team and reached the playoff stage in which he was eliminated against Celtic, and as a result fell to the UEFA Europa League stage. On 28 December, Ogu and Hapoel Be'er Sheva won the Toto Cup after a 4–1 win over Ironi Kiryat Shmona in the final game. On 29 April 2017, Ogu scored the winning goal in the championship game against Maccabi Tel Aviv helping Hapoel Be'er Sheva to win the league championship for the second time in a row.

Al-Adalah
In January 2020, Ogu signed for Al-Adalah on a six-month contract. He left the club having made seven appearances.

Hapoel Nof HaGalil F.C.
On 2 February 2022, Ogu returned to Israel to join newly promoted club H. Nof HaGalil until the end of the season.

Maccabi Jaffa
On 30 May 2022, signed for Maccabi Jaffa.

International career
In March 2013, Ogu was called up to the Nigerian national side for a 2014 FIFA World Cup qualifier. He debuted against Kenya in a 1–1 draw, where he was used as a substitute to replace an injured Victor Moses. On 31 May, Ogu scored his first international goal against Mexico in a friendly game which took place at the Reliant Stadium in Houston. On 9 June, Nigerian coach Stephen Keshi selected Ogu as one of 23 players to participate in the 2013 FIFA Confederations Cup.

On 18 March 2015, he was called up with 27 other players for the proposed friendly matches against Bolivia and South Africa.

In May 2018 he was named to Nigeria's preliminary 30-man squad for the 2018 FIFA World Cup in Russia. He was included in the 23-man squad to AFCON 2019.

Career statistics

Club

International

Scores and results list Nigeria's goal tally first, score column indicates score after each Ogu goal.

Honours

Club
Hapoel Beer Sheva
 Israeli Premier League: 2015–16, 2016–17, 2017–18
Israel Super Cup: 2016, 2017
Toto Cup: 2016–17

References

1988 births
Living people
Sportspeople from Lagos
Nigerian footballers
Nigeria international footballers
Nigerian expatriate footballers
Association football midfielders
Primeira Liga players
Segunda Divisão players
Israeli Premier League players
Saudi Professional League players
Dakkada F.C. players
NK Drava Ptuj players
Atlético Clube de Portugal players
UD Almería B players
U.D. Leiria players
Associação Académica de Coimbra – O.A.F. players
Hapoel Be'er Sheva F.C. players
Al-Adalah FC players
Hapoel Nof HaGalil F.C. players
Maccabi Jaffa F.C. players
2013 FIFA Confederations Cup players
2018 FIFA World Cup players
2019 Africa Cup of Nations players
Expatriate footballers in Slovenia
Nigerian expatriate sportspeople in Slovenia
Expatriate footballers in Portugal
Nigerian expatriate sportspeople in Portugal
Expatriate footballers in Spain
Nigerian expatriate sportspeople in Spain
Expatriate footballers in Israel
Nigerian expatriate sportspeople in Israel
Nigerian expatriate sportspeople in Saudi Arabia
Expatriate footballers in Saudi Arabia